St. Anthony Village High School is a public high school in St. Anthony Village, Minnesota, United States.

School Overview
St. Anthony Village High School is ranked 14th within Minnesota, according to US News. Students have the opportunity to take Advanced Placement® course work and exams. The AP® participation rate at St. Anthony Village High School is 71 percent. The student body makeup is 54 percent male and 46 percent female, and the total minority enrollment is 29 percent. Additionally, 22 percent of students at St. Anthony are economically disadvantaged. St. Anthony Village High School is the only high school serving ISD #282, and it has a total enrollment of 715.  It attracts a large number of open-enrollment students from other communities. The school shares facilities with St. Anthony Village Middle School. The elementary school for the district is Wilshire Park Elementary. Additionally, St. Charles Borromeo offers private school education for grades K-8. At just 2.6 square miles, the school district is geographically the smallest in the state of Minnesota.

Academics
St. Anthony traditionally does very well in standardized tests in the state and is quite successful academically.  U.S. News ranked the school #783 in their national rankings. The student:teacher ratio at St. Anthony High School is 23:1. Additionally, St. Anthony is a participant in the University of Minnesota's College in the Schools program.  Its academic teams also do well:  St. Anthony won the 2004, 2006, 2007, 2010, and 2011 AA knowledge bowl competitions and the 2005 Minnesota Science Bowl competition.

Athletics/Activities
St. Anthony’s team mascot is the Huskie and the school colors are royal blue and white. The team won the 2006 and 2008 State AA baseball championships.  Baseball games are played at Palm Field and football games at Denison Field. The St Anthony huskies won the 4AAAA section championship and proceeded to Minnesota state football championships in 2018.

The St. Anthony's RoboHuskie team has participated in the FIRST Robotics Competition program since the 2007-2008 season. They earned the Highest Seeded Rookie award at the Milwaukee Regional in 2008.  RoboHuskie earned the 2nd seed during the 2009 10,000 Lakes Regional.  In 2010 they won the Wisconsin regional competition and went to Atlanta, Georgia for the FIRST Championship.

St. Anthony recently rejoined the Tri-Metro Conference.  Previously, it had competed in the Metro Alliance after leaving the Tri-Metro in 1997, returning after the latter disbanded in 2005.  They compete in most sports at the 2A level.

The school is not large enough to support all sports on its own, so boys’ and girls hockey is concurrent with Irondale High School and co-ed Nordic skiing, wrestling, and co-ed track are joint-teams with Spring Lake Park High School.

St. Anthony has historically had a rivalry with neighboring Columbia Heights High School.

Notable alumni
 Phil Carruthers, former Speaker of the Minnesota House of Representatives
 Dr. Joseph R. Pawlik, Frank Hawkins Kenan Distinguished Professor of Marine Biology, UNCW

References

Public high schools in Minnesota
Schools in Hennepin County, Minnesota